Garbatella is a station on the Line B of the Rome Metro. It was opened in 1990 and is located behind the former Mercati Generali di Roma, on the via Ostiense in the Ostiense quarter. It replaces the old Garbatella station 200m away, whose entrance was on Piazza Giancarlo Vallauri (the present one is accessed from Via Giacinto Pullino).

Surroundings
Garbatella
Former Mercati Generali
University of Rome III
Teatro Palladium

References

External links

Rome Metro Line B stations
Railway stations opened in 1990
1990 establishments in Italy
Rome Q. X Ostiense
Railway stations in Italy opened in the 20th century